The Canadian Global Affairs Institute (CGAI) is an independent, non-partisan research institute based in Calgary with offices in Ottawa. Incorporated as a charitable organization in 2000, the institute seeks to focus the national debate and understanding of Canada's international policies, with the ultimate aim of ensuring a more globally engaged Canada. 

CGAI believes that doing so enhances Canadian security and prosperity. The institute is dedicated to educating Canadians, particularly those who have leadership roles in shaping Canadian foreign policy, about the importance of Canada being proactive in world affairs with tangible diplomatic military and aid assets.

Activities

The Dispatch 
The Canadian Global Affairs Institute produces a quarterly newsletter called The Dispatch. The Dispatch invites CGAI fellows to provide insight on international issues of relevance to Canada.

Strategic Studies Working Group 
The Strategic Studies Working Group (SSWG) is a partnership between CGAI and the Canadian International Council (CIC), which incorporated the former Canadian Institute of Strategic Studies. The SSWG is administered by CGAI, which also conducts research and produces publications on security and defence issues on behalf of the partnership. All projects undertaken by the SSWG are first approved by CIC and are co-published or co e-published according to CIC standards.

The SSWG has begun to host e-conferences on issues related to defence and security. These e-conferences take place over a number of weeks, with each week dedicated to a specific topic. The e-conferences include regular commentaries by academics and practitioners, Twitter Q&As, live chats and major articles published in national media.
 The "Future of Fighting" conference focused on how the Canadian Forces might evolve in the coming decade to reflect the changing funding and combat environment.
 The "Drone Week" conference was focused on understanding some of the practical, legal and moral questions surrounding the current and future use of drones and other unmanned aerial vehicles.

The SSWG produces research papers which keep in line with the partnership's purpose of focusing on defence and security topics. The Strategic Profile Canada is a project which provides a comprehensive overview of Canada's demographic, economic and military information.

3Ds Blog 
The 3Ds Blog is a site managed by CGAI and provides defence and security news from Canada and around the world. Blog updates are made by CGAI fellows, the majority coming from Mark Collins.

Speakers Series 
The CGAI organizes an annual speakers series based on a specific topic of importance to Canadian defence, security, and foreign affairs. The speaking events are held in Calgary and bring together businesspeople, academics, and practitioners to listen to some of Canada's most important and influential thinkers. Former speakers include Peter MacKay, Minister of National Defence; Michael Bell, former diplomat; and Yuen Pau Woo, president and CEO of the Asia Pacific Foundation of Canada, among others.

Ross Munro Award 
The Ross Munro Media Award was initiated, in 2002, by the Conference of Defence Associations, in concert with CGAI. It is awarded annually to recognize one Canadian journalist who has made a significant and outstanding contribution to the general public's understanding of Canada's defence and security issues.

Military Journalism Course 
The Military Journalism Course was started in 2002 as a nine-day course, which introduces university students to military journalism and the Canadian Armed Forces. The course is run in partnership with the Centre for Military and Strategic Studies at the University of Calgary and includes a combination of media-military theory in a classroom setting, coupled with field visits to Armed Forces regular and reserve units. The stated goal of the program is to enhance the military education of future Canadian journalists who will report on Canadian military activities domestically and abroad. 
In 2007, the program introduced its first Francophone Military Journalism course held at the Université de Montréal and Canadian Forces Base Valcartier, near Québec City.

Advisory Council 
A group of advisers provide feedback on current and future programs.
 Ian Brodie
 Jean Charest, PC
 Laura Dawson
 Richard Fadden
 Robert Fowler, OC
 Dan Hays, PC
 Marie-Lucie Morin, PC
 John Manley, PC OC
 Bob Rae, PC OC
 Christopher Waddell
 Robert Wright

Fellowship Program

Fellows 
 David Bercuson, OC, FRSC
 Jean-Christophe Boucher
 Brett Boudreau
 Brian Bow
 David Carment
 Joseph Caron
 Andrea Charron
 Howard Coombs
 Barry Cooper
 Daryl Copeland
 Jocelyn Coulon
 D. Michael Day
 Ferry de Kerckhove
 Paul Durand
 Ross Fetterly
 Patricia Fortier
 Julian Lindley-French
 Frédérick Gagnon
 Sarah Goldfeder
 Andrew Griffith
 Marius Grinius
 Robert Hage
 Rolf Holmboe
 Rob Huebert
 Peter Jones
 Thomas Juneau
 Tom Keenan
 Adam Lajeunesse
 Randolph Mank
 Eric Miller
 Robert Muggah
 David Perry
 Vanja Petricevic
 George Petrolekas
 Joël Plouffe
 Andrew Rasiulis
 Tom Ring
 Colin Robertson
 Lindsay L. Rodman
 Stephen Saideman
 Darren Schemmer
 Hugh Segal, CM
 Elinor Sloan
 Gary Soroka
 Hugh Stephens
 Alan Stephenson
 Stéfanie von Hlatky
 Charity Weeden

Notable alumni  
 Perrin Beatty, PC
 Derek Burney, OC
 Paul Dewar
 Andrew Godefroy, CD
 J.L. Granatstein, OC
 Hrach Gregorian
 Mike Jeffery, CMM, CD
 Andrew Leslie, CMM, MSC, MSM, CD
 George Macdonald
 Paul Maddison
 Roland Paris
 David Pratt
 Stephen Randall, FRSC

Recognition
Fellows regularly provide commentary and analysis of ongoing international events in TV and print media. CGAI Vice-President Colin Robertson was named in Embassy Magazine's 2012 ranking of the "Top 80 Influencing Canada Foreign Policy". The University of Pennsylvania has consistently ranked CGAI highly on its list of top think tanks in Canada.

Criticism and controversy 
In an article from July 2016, The Globe and Mail examined the Institute's support of Canada's $15-billion combat-vehicle sale to Saudi Arabia at a time of a humanitarian crisis in Yemen, and the think tank's acceptance of donations from defense contractor General Dynamics - the parent of the arms maker in the export contract.

An article in 2017 from The Huffington Post goes on to say about the Saudi arms deal: "At least four of the General Dynamics-funded institute's "fellows" wrote columns justifying the sale, including an opinion Perry published in The Globe and Mail Report on Business titled "Without foreign sales, Canada's defence industry would not survive."

References

External links
 

Military of Canada
Think tanks based in Canada
Foreign policy and strategy think tanks
Organizations established in 2001
2001 establishments in Alberta
Internet properties established in 2001
Non-profit organizations based in Alberta
Political and economic think tanks based in Canada
Think tanks established in 2001